Daniel Vargas  (born 1 September 1986) is a Mexican male volleyball player,   a member of  Mexico men's national volleyball team, where he played at the Olympic Games 2016 Rio, and at the 2014 FIVB Volleyball Men's World Championship in Poland. Before joining the national team, Daniel played for Pumas UNAM, while doing his masters and undergraduate studies in  Electrical Engineering at the  National Autonomous University of Mexico (UNAM).

Career
During the summer of 2016, Vargas along with Mexico men's national volleyball team, ended their 48-year absence in the Olympic Games, when they secured the final place at stake for the Rio 2016 Olympic Games through the World Olympic Qualification Tournament, which took place in their home turf in Mexico City.

Clubs
 Pumas UNAM (2014)

References

1986 births
Living people
Mexican men's volleyball players
Place of birth missing (living people)
Olympic volleyball players of Mexico
Volleyball players at the 2016 Summer Olympics
Sportspeople from Mexico City